Anacoracidae is a family of extinct mackerel sharks that lived during the Cretaceous. It includes four valid genera: Nanocorax, Ptychocorax, Scindocorax, and Squalicorax. Two previously-included genera, Galeocorax and Pseudocorax, were reassigned to the family Pseudocoracidae.

References

 
Shark families
Prehistoric cartilaginous fish families
Taxa named by Henri Cappetta
Cretaceous first appearances
Cretaceous extinctions